Tamparan, officially the Municipality of Tamparan (Maranao: Inged a Tamparan), is a 5th class municipality in the province of Lanao del Sur, Philippines. According to the 2020 census, it has a population of 32,074 people.

History

Etymology and origin
Its name was derived from the Maranao word tamparan which literally means "frontge."

During the American colonial presence in the country Sultan Mangking Sugador was appointed by the American government as Municipal District President, a position equal to the rank of Municipal Mayor, although lesser in power than the latter. When asked by the American Officials about his name, the Sultan said “I am the Sultan of Tamparan,” referring to the dowa ka lokus-tribal leaders of Tamparan. Sultan Mangking Sugador became popular by his royal title that American officials started calling the town Tamparan.

Declaration
The creation of the Municipality of Tamparan could be traced way back to the Commonwealth Government of the Philippines under then-President Manuel L. Quezon.  It was in the year 1940 President Quezon issued an Executive Order known as Commonwealth Act No. 592 creating Dansalan (now Marawi City) as a regular municipality and Tamparan as its municipal district covering the areas (now municipalities) of Masiu, Taraka, Poona-Bayabao, Lumba Bayabao, Maguing, Mulondo, Bumbaran and Wao.

Tamparan District became a regular municipality on September 28, 1960, by virtue of Executive Order No. 405 and consequently declared Islamic Municipality pursuant to Batas Pambansa (PB) Number 33 on June 4, 1984.

Geography
Tamparan is located on the eastern part of Lanao del Sur. It is bounded on the north by the Municipality of Taraka, on the south by Poona-Bayabao, and on the west by Lake Lanao.

Tamparan and Marawi City are connected by road passing through the municipalities of Ditsaan-Ramain, Bubong, Buadi-Puso Buntong, Mulondo and Taraka. Tamparan is also accessible by water transportation through the Lake Lanao.

The municipality of Tamparan has a total land area of  more or less.  Agricultural area comprises 42.30%, built-up area is 5.46%, open grassland 48.60%, while roads/creeks and river constitute 3.64%.

Barangays
Tamparan is politically subdivided into 44 barangays.

Topography
The Municipality lies on the plain and slightly sloppy area hence erosion is less.  But due to its location along the lake, some of the areas are affected by the rise and fall of the lake water level.

Climate

A stable north-west wind blows from January to September. In the months of October and November, the wind blows either north-west or north–south.

Generally, the municipality is under the fourth type of climate characterized by even distribution of rainfall through the year. The heaviest rain is experienced in the months of January, May, and July. Dry months are September and November.

Demographics

Language and ethnicity
The majority of the Tamparanian (or Itamparanen in Mëranaw) traces their roots to Meranao ethnicity although there are also Tagalog, Bisaya and other ethnicities who migrated in the town. The vernacular language is Filipino in the form of Mëranaw, while Tagalog and English are the languages also widely used in education and business throughout the town.

Religion
The majority of Tamparanian are Muslims. Sunni Islam is the predominant religion and widely practiced. Many people have studied Islamic (Muslim) and Arabic education both within the country and abroad. Other religious groups such as Christian could also be found in town.

Economy

Education

 Tamparan Populace Islamic College (TPIC)
 As-salihein Integrated School
 Mindanao State University - Tamparan
 Datu Palawan Disomimba Memorial National High School

References

External links
 Tamparan Profile at the DTI Cities and Municipalities Competitive Index
 [ Philippine Standard Geographic Code]
 Tamparan Community Website
 Philippine Standard Geographic Code
 Philippine Census Information
 Local Governance Performance Management System

Municipalities of Lanao del Sur
Populated places on Lake Lanao
Establishments by Philippine executive order